The women's 400 metre freestyle competition of the swimming events at the 1959 Pan American Games took place on 2 September (preliminaries)  and 6 September (finals). The last Pan American Games champion was Beth Whittall of Canada.

This race consisted of eight lengths of the pool, with all eight being in the freestyle stroke.

Results
All times are in minutes and seconds.

Heats
The first round was held on September 2.

Final 
The final was held on September 6.

References

Swimming at the 1959 Pan American Games
Pan